A wharenui (literally "large house") is a communal house of the Māori people of New Zealand, generally situated as the focal point of a marae. Wharenui are usually called meeting houses in New Zealand English, or simply called whare (a more generic term simply referring to a house or building).
Also called a whare rūnanga ("meeting house") or whare whakairo (literally "carved house"), the present style of wharenui originated in the early to middle nineteenth century. The houses are often carved inside and out with stylized images of the iwi's (or tribe's) ancestors, with the style used for the carvings varying from tribe to tribe. Modern meeting houses are built to regular building standards. Photographs of recent ancestors may be used as well as carvings. The houses always have names, sometimes the name of a famous ancestor or sometimes a figure from Māori mythology. Some meeting houses are built at places that are not the location of a tribe, but where many Māori gather; typically, a school or tertiary institution with many Māori students.

While a meeting house is considered sacred, it is not a church or house of worship, but religious rituals may take place in front of or inside a meeting house. On most marae, no food may be taken into the meeting house.

History

Wharenui have been built in New Zealand for hundreds of years. By the 15th century, wharenui became more elaborately carved, and large enough that one or two central pou (posts) were needed to carry the weight of the structure. In the 18th century during the voyages of James Cook, he and his crew sighted wharenui which were 10 metres in length, and entirely carved.

The introduction of steel tools by European settlers allowed the size and scale of wharenui to increase, and wharenui built from the 1840s onwards became the direct antecedents of the style and structure of modern wharenui. Taiporohenui, constructed at Manawapou (near modern day Mokoia in South Taranaki) in the 1850s, was 27.6 metres long and 9.2 metres wide. The size and scale of Taiporohenui symbolised the opposition of Māori to European settlement and colonisation of traditional lands. Te Kooti oversaw the construction of three massive wharenui during the New Zealand Wars. The first, Tanewhirinaki, which was completed in the late 1860s and located at Waioeka, was painted in black, pink and white. Construction of Te Whai-a-te-Motu at Ruatāhuna began in 1870, and was eventually completed in 1888. The third, Te Tokanganui-a-Noho, was constructed at Te Kuiti in 1873, after Te Kooti retreated behind the border of the King Country. These wharenui were used for meetings, church services and accommodation. After the construction of Te Tokanganui-a-Noho, very few wharenui were created for decades, and those which were built were simpler and uncarved.

By the 1920s, marae and wharenui had become a symbol of Māori cultural identity, especially among people who were landless. Āpirana Ngata was a proponent of reviving wharenui as a symbol of Māori identity and mana. Waikato Tainui leader Te Puea Hērangi was a large proponent of the re-development of marae in the country, leading to the construction of wharenui at Tūrangawaewae in Ngāruawāhia and Te Puea Memorial Marae, the first urban marae in Auckland.

During the 19th and early 20th century, missionaries and Christians condemned whakairo depicting genitalia, and removed penises of ancestors from the carvings on wharenui. Opposition to carvings depicting genitalia began to cease in the 1940s.

Structure

The building often symbolises an ancestor of the wharenui's tribe. So different parts of the building refer to body parts of that ancestor:

 The koruru at the point of the gable on the front of the wharenui can represent the ancestor's head
 The maihi (diagonal bargeboards) signify arms; the ends of the maihi are called raparapa, meaning "fingers"
 The tāhuhu (ridge beam) represents the backbone
 The heke or rafters signify ribs
 Internally, the poutokomanawa (central column) literally means the post that supports the heart

Other important components of the wharenui include:
 The amo, the vertical supports that hold up the ends of the maihi
 The poupou, upright carved panels that line the inside walls of the verandah and interior
 The kūwaha or front door, along with the pare or door lintel
 The paepae, the horizontal element on the ground at the front of the wharenui, acts as the threshold of the building
 The marae ātea comprises a very important open space directly in front of the wharenui, and is used to welcome visitors onto the marae. It also serves as an area on which to debate issues.

Protocols
Meeting houses are the centre of any cultural, business, or any affair which is relevant to the iwi as a whole.
Typically, visitors to the village would be allowed to stay in the meeting house at night.
Ceremonial occasions, including wedding and funeral typically take place in the meeting house or on the marae ātea in front of the house.
Strict rules of conduct generally govern the use of the wharenui, which is considered the domain of unity and peace. If anyone should become irate or physically violent, they would be asked to leave the house until they can control their temper.

See also
Māori culture
Māori language
Longhouse
Meeting house

References

External links

This picture is the opening of Te Wheke Hall on December 30, 1901.
The Field Museum of Natural History in Chicago, Illinois has an original Māori meeting house, called Ruatepupuke II as shown in this photo.
The British Museum has a large collection of Māori art.

Māori culture
Māori words and phrases
Indigenous architecture
Vernacular architecture